Sica can refer to:
Sica, a style of sword from antiquity
Mario Sica
Jessica Jung (nicknamed "Sica"), a South Korean entertainer 
Sica Ho, a Hong Kong entertainer

SICA can refer to:

Central American Integration System (Sistema de la Integración Centroamericana/Système d'intégration centraméricaine)
Subud International Cultural Association
Solomon Islands Christian Association
South Inter-Conference Association, an Illinois high school athletic conference
South Indian Cultural Association, Hyderabad
South Indian Cultural Association, Indore
Small Independent Cidermakers Association